Pagbabalik ng Panday is a 1981 Filipino fantasy film produced and directed by Fernando Poe Jr., based on the Pilipino Komiks character Panday. It is the sequel to the 1980 film Ang Panday and stars Poe as the titular character, alongside Tina Revilla, Max Alvarado, Bentot Jr., Rosemarie Gil, Lito Anzures, Lilian Laing, and Sarah Cariño. The film was released by FPJ Productions on December 25, 1981 as an official entry of the 7th Metro Manila Film Festival. Ang Panday: Ikatlong Yugto followed in 1982.

Cast
Fernando Poe Jr. as Flavio / Panday
Tina Revilla
Max Alvarado as Lizardo
Bentot Jr. as Lando
Rosemarie Gil
Lito Anzures as Tata Temio
Jose Romulo
Lilian Laing
Sarah Cariño
Michael Pigar
Eddie Gicoso
Mary Ann Galapin
Amy Anzures
Clint de Castro
Ernie David
Efren Belardo
Buddy Dator

Accolades

References

External links

Panday
1981 films
1980s fantasy action films
Films directed by Fernando Poe Jr.
Philippine fantasy action films